SN 1992bd was a type II supernova event in NGC 1097,  positioned some 1.5″ east and 9″ south of the galactic nucleus. It was discovered by astronomers Chris Smith and Lisa Wells on October 12, 1992. Spectra of the object collected October 17 showed it to have an expansion velocity of 7,500 km/s. Subsequent examination of archival images from the Hubble Space Telescope showed an image of the supernova had been captured on September 20, 1992, 12 days prior to its discovery with ground-based telescopes. The eruption occurred in the circumnuclear star-forming region of the galaxy.

See also
 Spiral Galaxy NGC 1097

References

External links
 Simbad

SN 1992bd
Astronomical objects discovered in 1992